Phyllonorycter adenocarpi is a moth of the family Gracillariidae. It is known from the  Iberian Peninsula.

The wingspan is about 8 mm. Adults are on wing in May and August in two generations in western Europe.

The larvae feed on Adenocarpus hispanicus. They mine the leaves of their host plant. They create a lower-surface tentiform mine. Pupation takes place inside the mine.

External links
bladmineerders.nl
Fauna Europaea

adenocarpi
Moths of Europe
Moths described in 1863